Neoplanorbis is a genus of small, freshwater, air-breathing snails. They are aquatic pulmonate gastropod mollusks in the family Planorbidae, the ram's horn snails.

Neoplanorbis is the type genus of the subfamily Neoplanorbinae.

The shells of species in this genus appear to be dextral in coiling, but as is the case in all planorbids, the shell is actually sinistral. The shell is carried upside down with the aperture on the right, and this makes it appear to be dextral.

Species 
The genus Neoplanorbis includes the following species:
 † Neoplanorbis carinatus Walker, 1908
 † Neoplanorbis smithi Walker, 1908
 † Neoplanorbis tantillus Pilsbry, 1906 the type species
 † Neoplanorbis umbilicatus Walker, 1908

Original description 
Genus Neoplanorbis was originally described by Henry Augustus Pilsbry in 1906.

Note that Pilsbry described the shell as if it were dextral, whereas planorbids are now known to be sinistral in shell coiling. In other words what Pilsbry describes as the "impressed and turned in" apex of the shell is actually the center of the umbilicus.

Pilsbry's original text (the original description) reads as follows:

References 

Planorbidae
Taxonomy articles created by Polbot